The 2013 Mid-Eastern Athletic Conference men's basketball tournament took place March 11–16, 2013 at the Norfolk Scope in Norfolk, Virginia.   The tournament winner, North Carolina A&T, received an automatic bid into the 2013 NCAA tournament. 2013 was the first year in Norfolk after the last eight years in Winston-Salem, North Carolina.  First Round games were played on March 11 and March 12, with the Quarterfinal games played March 13 and March 14.  The semifinals were held March 15, with the Championship game being played on March 16. ESPNU televised the Championship Game.

Bracket

All times listed are Eastern

References

Tournament
MEAC men's basketball tournament
MEAC
Basketball competitions in Norfolk, Virginia
College basketball tournaments in Virginia